Piriaka  is a small rural settlement beside the Whanganui River, about  southeast of Taumarunui on State Highway 4 (SH4), in New Zealand's King Country. Its name is Māori, from piri (to cling close) and aka (bush climbers of various kinds, such as rata).

These springs are well known in the local area, and also provide the main water supply for the settlement.

This spot is known as the Piriaka lookout.

References

External links 
 Te Ara – places near Taumarunui

See also
Ruapehu District
Piriaka railway station

Populated places in Manawatū-Whanganui
Settlements on the Whanganui River
Ruapehu District